Leetown is an unincorporated community in northern Frederick County, Virginia, United States. Leetown is located on Old Charles Town Road (VA 761) at its intersection with Gun Club Road (VA 666) to the west of Opequon Creek. According to the Geographic Names Information System, Leetown has also been known throughout its history as Opequon Hill.

References

Unincorporated communities in Frederick County, Virginia
Unincorporated communities in Virginia